Neenah is an unincorporated community in Westmoreland County, in the U. S. state of Virginia.

History
A post office called Neenah was established in 1900, and remained in operation until it was discontinued in 1958. Neenah is a name derived from a Native American language meaning "pure".

References

Unincorporated communities in Virginia
Unincorporated communities in Westmoreland County, Virginia